Damaged Hearts is a 1924 American silent drama film directed by T. Hayes Hunter and starring Eugene Strong, Mary Carr, Helen Rowland, and Tyrone Power Sr. It marked the feature film debut of the future star Brian Donlevy.

Plot
As described in a film magazine review, owing the entire world a grudge, David immures himself from society in the Everglades. An orphan, his only sister had been adopted by some wealthy folks but had died, and he was badly treated by Hugh, the son of the family. Later, in revenge he kidnaps Edwina, the wife of Hugh, and they fall in love. Learning that her husband is suspected of having slain her, she returns to her lawful spouse, but finds him with another charmer. The husband seeks revenge, and there is an underwater fight with Hugh and David clad in diving suits. A hunchback, jealous of David, intervenes and accidentally stabs Hugh to death. The Everglades hermit finds happiness with Edwina, the woman he abducted.

Cast

References

Bibliography
 Munden, Kenneth White. The American Film Institute Catalog of Motion Pictures Produced in the United States, Part 1. University of California Press, 1997.

External links

1924 films
1924 drama films
Silent American drama films
Films directed by T. Hayes Hunter
American silent feature films
1920s English-language films
American black-and-white films
Film Booking Offices of America films
1920s American films